is a former Japanese football player.

Playing career
Hiroyuki Matsumoto played for Thespakusatsu Gunma and Fujieda MYFC from 2012 to 2014.

References

External links

1989 births
Living people
Kansai University alumni
Association football people from Osaka Prefecture
Japanese footballers
J2 League players
J3 League players
Thespakusatsu Gunma players
Fujieda MYFC players
Association football goalkeepers